The 1964 Boston Red Sox season was the 64th season in the franchise's Major League Baseball history. The Red Sox finished eighth in the American League (AL) with a record of 72 wins and 90 losses, 27 games behind the AL champion New York Yankees.

Offseason 
 February 4, 1964: Carmen Fanzone was signed as an amateur free agent by the Red Sox.
 Prior to 1964 season: Bob Smith was released by the Red Sox.

Regular season

Season standings

Record vs. opponents

Opening Day lineup

Notable transactions 
 September 6, 1964: Wilbur Wood was purchased from the Red Sox by the Pittsburgh Pirates.

Roster

Player stats

Batting

Starters by position 
Note: Pos = Position; G = Games played; AB = At bats; H = Hits; Avg. = Batting average; HR = Home runs; RBI = Runs batted in

Other batters 
Note: G = Games played; AB = At bats; H = Hits; Avg. = Batting average; HR = Home runs; RBI = Runs batted in

Pitching

Starting pitchers 
Note: G = Games pitched; IP = Innings pitched; W = Wins; L = Losses; ERA = Earned run average; SO = Strikeouts

Other pitchers 
Note: G = Games pitched; IP = Innings pitched; W = Wins; L = Losses; ERA = Earned run average; SO = Strikeouts

Relief pitchers 
Note: G = Games pitched; W = Wins; L = Losses; SV = Saves; ERA = Earned run average; SO = Strikeouts

Farm system 

Statesville affiliation shared with the Houston Colt .45s

Source:

References

External links
1964 Boston Red Sox team page at Baseball Reference
1964 Boston Red Sox season at baseball-almanac.com

Boston Red Sox seasons
Boston Red Sox
Boston Red Sox
1960s in Boston